The Soviet Union women's national under-16 basketball team was a national basketball team of the Soviet Union. It represented the country in international under-16 (under age 16) women's basketball competitions, until the dissolution of the Soviet Union in 1991. After 1992, the successor countries all set up their own national teams.

FIBA U16 Women's European Championship

See also
Soviet Union women's national basketball team
Soviet Union women's national under-19 basketball team
Soviet Union men's national under-16 basketball team
Russia women's national basketball team
Russia women's national under-17 basketball team

References

Women's basketball in the Soviet Union
Basketball teams in the Soviet Union
Women's national under-16 basketball teams
W